Bazouges Cré sur Loir is a commune in the department of Sarthe, northwestern France. The municipality was established on 1 January 2017 by merger of the former communes of Bazouges-sur-le-Loir (the seat) and Cré-sur-Loir.

See also 
Communes of the Sarthe department

References 

Communes of Sarthe